Church is a Liverpool City Council Ward. The population of this ward taken at the 2011 census was 13,974. It contains part of the Mossley Hill area of Liverpool. It includes the road Penny Lane, famous for the Beatles song of the same name. The ward boundary was changed at the 2004 municipal elections to encompass parts of the former Grassendale and Allerton wards and losing part to the new Wavertree ward.

Councillors

 indicates seat up for re-election after boundary changes.

 indicates seat up for re-election.

 indicates change in affiliation.

 indicates seat up for re-election after casual vacancy.

Election results

Elections in the 2020s

Elections in the 2010s

Elections in the 2000s 

After the boundary change of 2004 the whole of Liverpool City Council faced election. Three Councillors were returned.

∗ italics denotes the sitting Councillor. * bold denotes the winning candidate.

External links
Ward Profile

References

Wards of Liverpool